Suvi Suresh (born as Swetha Suresh on 26 September 1987) is an Indian singer with Sri Lankan roots. She was a member of the band S5 launched by the channel SS Music. She shot to fame with the song "Kodana Kodi" from Saroja, composed by Yuvan Shankar Raja. Presently, she is a member of the band Soulsonic. She was sung & dance for 'Koodanu Kodi' song in Stage in the program "Mega Unplugged" on 2010 that had her costume was totally gorgeous. Whole of the audience were shocked to see her in that costume. But now that "Mega Unplugged" concert show is not available. So fans are very sad and all fans are now requesting to get that music concert video in Social media.

Biography
Swetha hails from Thrissur, Kerala, India. She owes her name to a spelling mistake. She wanted to be known by her pet name "Swe" but on the Kuruvi cover her name was printed as "Suvi". She auditioned for SS Music's voice hunt competition at age 17 and was selected to be part of S5 with Benny Dayal, Anaitha Nair, Bhargavi Pillai and Arjun Sasi.

Discography
Isai
By the People
Kodana Kodi (Tamil) (2008)
Odi Odi Vilayaadu (Tamil) (2008)
Adada Vaa (Tamil) (2009)
Kasko (2009)
Mega Unplugged (Music concert that was telecasted on 2010 on Mega TV)
Kedakkari (Tamil) (2010)
Hawa Hawa (Hindi)(2011)
Asku laska Rap (Tamil)(2011)
Whistle Podu (Tamil) (2011)
Yedho Mayakkam (Tamil) (2011)
Manmadha Kaadu (Tamil) (2013)
Highway (2014 Hindi film)
Kaadhal Oru Kattukadhai (Tamil) (2017)
Wonder Woman (English) (2018)
 "Bubble Gum"

References

External links
 official website

1984 births
Living people
Tamil playback singers
Indian women playback singers
Malayali people
Telugu playback singers
Singers from Thrissur
Film musicians from Kerala
Indian women pop singers
21st-century Indian singers
Women musicians from Kerala
21st-century Indian women singers